On 14 April 2015, the United Nations Security Council adopted Resolution 2216 on Yemen. Fourteen members of the Council voted in favor, while only Russian Federation abstained. The Resolution imposed "sanctions on individuals undermining the stability of Yemen, calling all Yemeni parties, in particular the Houthis, to end violence and refrain from further unilateral actions that threatened the political transition."

The Council demanded that "the Houthis withdraw from all areas seized during the latest conflict, relinquish arms seized from military and security institutions, cease all actions falling exclusively within the authority of the legitimate Government of Yemen and fully implement previous Council resolutions."

See also 

 List of United Nations Security Council Resolutions 2201 to 2300
 List of United Nations Security Council resolutions concerning Yemen

References

External links 

 Resolution at undocs.org

 2216
 2216
2015 in Yemen